Venezuelans of Slovene descent, also Slovene Venezuelans number around 1,000.

History
The first Slovenians arrived in Venezuela between the two world wars, although in a small number, estimated at about 50 people. After World War II, a small Slovenian community of about 500 members formed, which settled between 1947 and 1953, mostly from the Littoral. This emigration was motivated by the dissatisfaction with the economic conditions and partly with the political conditions, and by existing ties with Slovenes in Venezuela. Based on different sources and testimonies, it is estimated that up to 1960 between 550 and 800 Slovenians arrived in Venezuela.

Most of the Slovenes settled in Caracas and in smaller numbers in Valencia, Maracay, Maracaibo, and Acarigua. In 1958 the Slovenian priest Janez Grilc arrived in Venezuela from Argentina, who proved to be an excellent organizer. That same year masses in Slovene began, and also pilgrimages with marked national qualities, followed the social and cultural gatherings. In 1966, the Sv. Ciril in Metod association was formally founded in Caracas, "whose events were between 100 and 150 people. They organize pilgrimages, during St. Nicholas Day and the commemoration of the independence of Slovenia. At that time, they formed the Asociación Eslovena (Slovenian Association), which is still active and which holds an annual gathering in Valencia in which a pilgrimage is carried out and a mass is offered. Due to the small number of Slovenian residents, a cultural center of their own did not exist, and so they participated in the events and celebrations of the Hogar Croata de Caracas (Croatian Club).

Starting in April 1959, the newspaper Življenje - Vida was published, with religious and informative themes.

Notable people
 Ladislv Blatnik, shoe entrepreneur
 Janez Grilc, priest
 Princess Tatiana of Greece and Denmark
 Danilo Žerjal, discus thrower and hammer thrower

References

External links 
Los Eslovenos en Venezuela
Eslovenos en Venezuela

European Venezuelan
Venezuelan